Mikko Simula (born 12 May 1973) is a Finnish former professional footballer who played as a midfielder in the Veikkausliiga, for Atlantis FC among other clubs.

References

External links
 http://www.atlantisfc.fi/fudis/akatemia/07a.htm

1973 births
Living people
Footballers from Helsinki
Finnish footballers
Association football midfielders
Veikkausliiga players
Helsingin Jalkapalloklubi players
FinnPa players
PK-35 Vantaa (men) players
AC Allianssi players
Atlantis FC players